Lacinutrix chionocetis is a Gram-negative, aerobic, rod-shaped and non-motile bacterium from the genus of Lacinutrix which has been isolated from the gut of a red snow crab.

References 

Flavobacteria
Bacteria described in 2021